This is a list of destinations operated to by Silver Airways, an American regional airline headquartered at Fort Lauderdale–Hollywood International Airport in the state of Florida. Over its history, the airline has operated flights for scheduled commercial operations as well as for essential air services.

Destinations 
, Silver Airways operates or has previously operated to the following destinations, whether through scheduled commercial flights or as part of an Essential Air Service. The list does not include destinations solely operated to by Silver's San Juan-based subsidiary airline, Seaborne Airlines, with which it shares operations based at Luis Muñoz Marín International Airport.

References

Lists of airline destinations